Hainanpotamon is a genus of freshwater crabs, containing the following species:
Hainanpotamon auriculatum Yeo & Naruse, 2008
Hainanpotamon daiae Yeo & Naruse, 2008
Hainanpotamon directum Yeo & Naruse, 2008
Hainanpotamon fuchengense Dai, 1995
Hainanpotamon glabrum (Dang, 1967)
Hainanpotamon helense Dai, 1995
Hainanpotamon orientale (Parisi, 1916)
Hainanpotamon rubrum (Dang & Tran, 1992)
Hainanpotamon vietnamicum (Dang & Hô, 2002)

The genus was originally described in 1975 by Dang as Orientalia but that name was a junior homonym of the mollusc genus Orientalia, established by Radoman in 1975. The first available name is therefore Hainanpotamon, independently established by Dai in 1975.

References

Potamoidea
Freshwater crustaceans of Asia